"Mad Wild" is a song by all-female German pop band No Angels. It was written by Flo August, Andrew Tyler, Ásdís María Viðarsdóttir, and Sophie Alexandra Tweed-Simmons and recorded by the group for their sixth regular studio album 20 (2021), while production was helmed by Christian Geller. Supported by a remix version, the song was released as the album's third single on 6 August 2021, and reached number 67 on the German Download Chart.

Background
"Mad Wild," co-written by American-Canadian singer Sophie Simmons, is the only title that was chosen from a selection of around a dozen songs which their record company BMG had proposed for recording, being the favorite indidivual choice of every No Angels member. A song about a toxic relationship that always ends in bed instead of being ended for the better, it is built upon a bouncing synth bass and a 1980s-style snare sample, blending elements of funk and pop with contemporary R&B sounds. Benaissa described "Mad Wild" as a "modern, powerful [...] feel good track."

Promotion
A lyric video for "Mad Wild" premiered online on 6 August 2021. Designed like an Instagram feed, it features behind the scenes footage as well as stills from the shootings for their music videos for "Daylight in Your Eyes (Celebration Version)" (2021) and Still in Love with You (Celebration Version)" (2021).

Track listings

Notes
 denotes additional producer

Personnel and credits 
Credits adapted from the liner notes of 20.

	
 Christoph Assmann – arranger, instruments
 Flo August – writer
 Nadja Benaissa – vocals
 Lucy Diakovska – vocals
 Christian Geller – arranger, instruments, producer
 Anya Mahnken – vocal arranger

 Sandy Mölling – vocals
 Andrew Tyler – writer
 Sophie Alexandra Tweed-Simmons – writer
 Ásdís María Viðarsdóttir – writer
 Jessica Wahls – vocals
 Dieter Wegner – mastering

Charts

Release history

References

No Angels songs
2021 singles
Synth-pop songs